Robert the Devil is a figure of medieval European legend.

Robert the Devil may also refer to:

Robert the Devil, or Robert le diable, an 1831 opera by Giacomo Meyerbeer
Robert the Devil (Gilbert), an 1868 operatic parody of Meyerbeer's opera by W. S. Gilbert
Robert the Devil (horse) (1877–1889), British thoroughbred racehorse
 Robert the Devil, an LNER Gresley pacific locomotive, named after the racehorse
Robert I, Duke of Normandy (1000–1035), sometimes identified with the character of legend